Włochy is one of the districts of Warsaw, located in the south-western part of city. Włochy borders districts Bemowo and Wola from the north, Ochota and Mokotów from the east, and Ursus and Ursynów from the south.

History
It is not known from where the name Włochy derives. Grammatically it is plural, and literally means "Italy" in Polish (see Walhaz for etymology, its modern English cognate is Welsh). One theory is that the name comes from a foreign army, probably Italian, that could have stayed in nearby Wola (a place where the election of Polish kings took place). Another theory is that name derives from Jan Yokel, who was called "Włoch". Seemingly he was the founder of the village in the forest.

Between 1938 and 1951 Włochy had town privileges. On 2 May 1951 Włochy was annexed into Warsaw as part of the Ochota district. Since 1994 it has formed the Warszawa-Włochy municipality. In 2002 the municipality became an independent district of Warsaw.

Neighbourhoods within the district 
 Nowe Włochy
 Okęcie
 Jadwisin
 Zbarż
 Opacz Wielka
 Paluch
 Gorzkiewki
 Raków
 Wiktoryn
 Salomea
 Stare Włochy
 Solipse 
 Budki Szczęśliwickie
 Załuski

References

External links